Barack Obama College Preparatory High School is a future high school in Chicago, Illinois that was scheduled to open in 2017 and will be named after President of the United States Barack Obama. It will be located right behind Skinner North Classical School and is planned to eventually be home to 1,200 students.

The opening of the school was delayed in 2016 because the money was needed for a new teacher contract.

References

2017 establishments in Illinois
Public high schools in Chicago